Alpenrose Dairy is a dairy and home delivery company located in the Hayhurst neighborhood of southwest Portland, Oregon, since 1916. It was owned by the Cadonau family for several generations until being sold to Smith Brothers Farms, a family-owned dairy located in Kent, Washington, in August 2019. 

The brand was named after the alpine rose (Rosa pendulina) by the Swiss-born wife and early co-owner of the dairy. Alpenrose is a "supplier of dairy products to retail, wholesale and ingredient customers in Portland and throughout the Northwest". In 2020, addressing the growing demand for delivery services the company introduced Alpenrose Home Delivery, a weekly grocery delivery service that provides customers with Alpenrose brand dairy products and other locally-made grocery items. Deliveries are facilitated by the company's fleet of milkmen and milkwomen, who deliver groceries by neighborhood and are unique to the service.

The  grounds of the dairy include:
Circuit d'Alpenrose, a velodrome, one of only 25 such tracks in the United States. The track was built to host the 1967 National Championships.  At 268.43 meters around with a  radius and a 43-degree bank, Alpenrose is one of the steepest velodromes in the country. Alpenrose is home to the only North American Six-day race. It hosts races all summer, and annually draws the largest velodrome crowd in North America for the Alpenrose Challenge, in mid-July.

Alpenrose Field, the site of baseball and softball games, including Little League Softball World Series games, from 1956-2019.
Dairyville, a replica of a western frontier town, with false-front shops, a doll museum, an ice cream parlor, a harness-maker's store, a music shop, and a 600-seat opera house with a pipe organ (with 4000 pipes).
A quarter-midget racing arena.

Products from Alpenrose include milk, ice cream, eggs, and various cultured dairy products.

Dairyville 

Dairyville was added to Alpenrose sometime in the 1960s. As stated above, the replica frontier town consists of a few streets of false front stores, a doll museum, an ice cream parlor, a music shop and a 600-seat opera house. The theater's pipe organ was salvaged from the Portland Civic Auditorium. Dairyville is typically open to the public on holidays and during the summer months.

For decades, Dairyville has hosted an annual holiday event called "Christmas in Dairyville." In addition to a gift shop and a house where children can have their photos taken with Santa Claus, there's also "Storybook Lane," an elaborate, walk-through attraction. Visitors wander through a snowy, moonlit mock-village inhabited by farm animals and displays based on Mother Goose's fables. The attraction also includes a tiny fire station for kids to play in. Elsewhere on the property, choir groups from local schools perform. Dairyville's opera house also hosts nightly screenings of comedy shorts featuring The Three Stooges and Laurel and Hardy, along with more contemporary entertainment like the 2004 film adaptation of The Polar Express. The event ended its annual run in 2005 but returned again for the 2011 Christmas season.

Dairyville's assets were auctioned off in 2020 and several of the items remain in the public view.  Some of the iconic red/gold carriages pulled by miniature horses in parades were bought and restored by Nob Hill Christmas Historical Society and now walk in the annual Starlight Parade, in addition several rows of seats from the Theater and reels of film from the Theater are publicly made available in Christmas time at the Nob Hill storage facility to enjoy a short from Shirley Temple or 3 Stooges .  The Calliope that clown Rusty Nails would walk with in the Parade was bought by the son of the wagons original builder.  Later in 2021 it was sold to a local collector to be preserved and displayed locally.  The houses from Storybook Lane were bought by 2 parties, one private collector in Sandy Oregon as well as the Nob Hill Christmas Historical Society.

Lawsuit 
On March 4, 2019, a lawsuit was filed in Multnomah County Circuit Court by three members of the Cadonau family against two other family members, alleging they are planning to sell the dairy and immediately stop all community events at Alpenrose. The family has since settled differences and dropped the lawsuit.
In February 2021 the property was closed to events and all other uses.

Future Development 
Lennar Northwest, Inc, represented by Westlake Consultants, Inc. submitted a "preapplication concept" for developing the Alpenrose property.  The application "proposes a 193-lot single-family detached residential land division".

The proposal includes:

 Pre-application project summary.  
 Land Division Preapplication Meeting -- Applicant Questions (May 18, 2021)
 Land Division Preapplication Concept (map)
 Early Assistance application
 Notice of a Pre-Application Conference (held June 17, 2021)
 Pre-Application Conference report (dated August 4, 2021)

References

External links 
 

Dairy products companies of the United States
Drink companies of the United States
Sports in Portland, Oregon
Manufacturing companies based in Portland, Oregon
Food and drink companies based in Portland, Oregon
Food and drink companies established in 1916
Privately held companies based in Oregon
1916 establishments in Oregon
Food and drink companies based in Oregon